XHVW-FM is a radio station on 90.5 FM in Acámbaro, Guanajuato, Mexico. XHVW is owned by Organización Radiofónica de Acámbaro and carries the Exa FM pop format from MVS Radio.

History

XHVW began as XEVW-AM 1160, which received its concession on March 8, 1961. It was owned by J. Jesús García Morales. In 1985, García Morales sold to Radio Acámbaro, S.A., which then became ORA in 2000.

After steady power increases over the years, XEVW migrated to FM in 2011 on 90.5 MHz. In 2016, XHVW flipped to Exa FM.

References

1961 establishments in Mexico
Contemporary hit radio stations in Mexico
Radio stations established in 1961
Radio stations in Guanajuato
Spanish-language radio stations